Zaida Catalán (6 October 1980 – March 2017) was a Swedish politician who was a member of the Green Party and leader of the Young Greens of Sweden between 2001 and 2005.

She was known for her work in activism including environmental issues, animal rights, and human rights (including support of Sweden's sex purchase law; see Prostitution in Sweden).

Catalán was kidnapped and murdered while on a UN mission to the Democratic Republic of the Congo in March 2017. Investigation into the crime is continued through March 2018, and critics allege the UN was irresponsible in sending her to a high-conflict zone with limited training and support. On 29 January 2022, a DR Congo court sentenced over 50 people for the murders of  Catalán and her American colleague Michael Sharp.

Biography

Early life 
Zaida Catalán was born in Stockholm but grew up in Högsby in Småland. Her mother was Swedish while her father had come to Sweden as a political refugee from Chile in 1975. She studied law at Stockholm University, obtaining a Master of Law degree.

Political career
With a background as an animal rights activist she in 2001 became the leader of the Young Greens of Sweden. After two years as the leader of the organisation along with Gustav Fridolin and two years along with Einar Westergaard, she resigned as leader of the Young Greens in 2005.

In late 2008, she announced her candidacy for the European Parliament for 2009. After an internal voting within the party she came fifth in the party's list for the parliament. After her personal campaign she received 16,300 in the election, which wasn't enough to get a place in the European Parliament. After the Swedish general election in 2006 she was part of the Stockholm City Council for the Green Party.

In December 2010, Catalán announced that she was to leave her work as a lawyer for the Green Party's parliamentary group and she was to start work as an expert on sexual violence for the European Union police work EUPOL in Goma, Democratic Republic of the Congo.

Kidnapping and murder
On 12 March 2017, Catalán and another UN employee, American Michael Sharp, were kidnapped during a mission near the village Ngombe in the Kasai Province in the Democratic Republic of the Congo. They were both found dead on 27 March. The UN was reportedly horrified when a grisly video of the killing of the two UN experts surfaced in April 2017. Catalán was found in a shallow grave; the body was beheaded, presumably as some kind of ritual (muti) by the murderers, but despite the arrest of two primary suspects by Congolese authorities, the head was never found. On 26 March 2018, one of the perpetrators, Vincent Manga, was captured by Kananga's military authorities and moved the investigation into a new direction in order to solve the incident.

On 29 March, Swedish authorities launched an investigation into the murder of Catalán; the Minister for Education Gustav Fridolin and the Prime Minister Stefan Löfven both expressed their dismay and sadness over her death and offered their condolences to her family. UN Secretary-General António Guterres also offered his condolences.

Criticism of the U.N. has been expressed about the U.N.'s approach to the mission of their two experts. They were sent into a remote and violence-torn area on motorbike taxis with only an interpreter at their side and without much training, safety equipment or even health insurance, an "astoundingly irresponsible approach by the United Nations to an obviously dangerous and hugely important task."

Trials and sentences
Over 50 people were tried for the murder of Catalán and her American colleague. On 29 January 2022, 51 people were sentenced in a DR Congo court to a variety of punishment, including death penalty and life imprisonment, the lowest sentence being 10 years of imprisonment. The sentences can be appealed.

Homages to her memory
On February 20, 2018, the Zaida Catalán Room at the Chilean Embassy in Sweden was inaugurated.

In 2018, NOHA foundation (Network On Humanitarian Action) started a scholarship program in her memory.

In 2020, the Folke Bernadotte Academy was tasked by the Swedish Government to establish a scholarship aimed at supporting the implementation of UN Security Council Resolution (UNSCR) 1325 on women, peace and security. The scholarship was established in memory of Zaida Catalán.

See also
List of kidnappings
List of solved missing person cases

References

Further reading

1980 births
2010s missing person cases
2017 murders in the Democratic Republic of the Congo
2017 deaths
21st-century Swedish politicians
21st-century Swedish women politicians
Assassinated Swedish politicians
Deaths by decapitation
Female murder victims
Formerly missing people
Green Party (Sweden) politicians
Missing person cases in Africa
People murdered in the Democratic Republic of the Congo
Stockholm University alumni
Swedish feminists
Swedish people murdered abroad
Swedish people of Chilean descent
Swedish politicians of Chilean descent
Violence against women in the Democratic Republic of the Congo